Batrachorhina pruinosa is a species of beetle in the family Cerambycidae. It was described by Léon Fairmaire in 1871, originally under the genus Madecops. It is known from Comoros.

References

Batrachorhina
Beetles described in 1871